Office of Film and Literature Classification  may refer to:

 Office of Film and Literature Classification (Australia), was an Australian statutory classification and censorship authority which oversaw the Australian Classification Board 
 Office of Film and Literature Classification (New Zealand), a New Zealand government agency responsible for the classification of all films, videos, publications, and some video games within the country.